Maria-Letizia Buonaparte (née Ramolino; 24 August 1750 (or 1749) – 2 February 1836),  known as Letizia Bonaparte, was a Corsican noblewoman and mother of Napoleon I of France. She became known as “” after the proclamation of the Empire. She spent her later years in Rome where she died in February 1836.

Early life 
Maria-Letizia Ramolino was born in Ajaccio, Corsica (then part of the Republic of Genoa), as the daughter of Giovanni Geronimo Ramolino and his wife Angela Maria Pietra-Santa. Giovanni was an army officer with expertise in civil engineering, who commanded the Ajaccio garrison, and his family were low-ranking nobility from Lombardy established in Corsica several generations earlier.

Letizia was educated at home and trained in nothing but domestic skills, like most Corsican women at the time. After the death of her father, when she was six, her mother married Franz Fesch, a Swiss officer in the Genoese Navy at Ajaccio in 1757. The couple had two children, among them Letizia's half-brother, future Cardinal Joseph Fesch.

Marriage and children 

On 2 June 1764, 14-year-old Letizia married 18-year-old law student Carlo Buonaparte of Ajaccio. The Buonapartes, also part of the Corsican nobility, originally came from Tuscany in the early sixteenth century. Carlo had been studying law at Pisa University but left to marry her without taking his degree. First pregnant a few months later, she went on to give birth to thirteen children in all, of whom eight survived. A first son, named Napoleon, was born and died in 1765, followed by a baby girl who also died. Carlo then went to Rome where he spent the next two years. On his return, he joined republican leader Pasquale Paoli, becoming his part-time secretary. At the time, Letizia fell pregnant, eventually giving birth to Joseph, originally named Giuseppe, on 7 July 1768.

In 1768, when Genoa formally ceded the island to France, a Corsican guerrilla movement led by Paoli rose in revolt against the French. Carlo and Letizia, then 19-year-old and pregnant with the future Napoleon, joined Paoli and fled with the insurgents into the mountains near Corte. She would fight beside her husband in the struggle for independence. After the failure of the rebellion in May 1769, the couple returned to Ajaccio. On the feast of the Assumption, 15 August 1769, while she was at Mass in Ajaccio Cathedral, a minute's walk away from Casa Buonaparte, Letizia went into labour. According to the legend, she gave birth at home on a carpet of the living room where battles of the Iliad and Odyssey were woven. The little boy was christened Napoleon, after an uncle who had died the previous year. For the first time, Letizia was unable to produce milk and had to hire a wet nurse called Camilla Llati to act as a surrogate mother. Letizia kept only one servant - a woman named Mammuccia Caterina, who lived with the family without wages and acted as the midwife during Napoleon's birth. For a time, Letizia performed all the household chores while Mammuccia looked after the children.

Letizia and her husband Carlo befriended the new island's military governor, Charles Réné, Comte de Marbeuf and the intendant, Bertrand de Boucheporn, whose wife was the godmother of their son Louis. In 1777 Marbeuf secured Carlo's election as a deputy to represent Corsica at Versailles. At the end of 1778, Carlo took Joseph, Napoléon to the continent to study at the Collège d'Autun. The following year in May 1779, possibly because of Carlo and Letizia's friendship with the governor, and after Carlo was accorded a certificate of nobility, 9-year-old Napoleon was admitted to the Brienne cadet school under a scholarship.

Letizia remained in Ajaccio, bearing six more children, Lucien in 1775, Elisa in 1777, Louis in 1778, Pauline in 1780, Caroline in 1782 and Jérôme in 1784.

In 1784, Letizia managed to visit Napoleon at Brienne, even though no boy could leave the school grounds for six years and visits by parents were restricted. The same year, he was promoted to the Royal Military School in Paris. Two years later, he graduated as a second lieutenant and joined the 4th artillery regiment of la Fère based in Valence.

1785-1804
On 24 February 1785, Carlo died of stomach cancer, and Letizia became a widow with eight children at the age of 35. Joseph, as the eldest son, was now the head of the family and returned to Corsica after finishing his studies at Collège d'Autun. In September 1786, Napoleon returned to Ajaccio, after eight years away, as a lieutenant in the Royal Army and stayed until September.  The family financial situation worsened, and Letizia had four children dependent on her as well as school fees to pay for Jerome and Joseph. Napoleon returned at the beginning of 1788 on a leave until June as the only breadwinner and as such the new head of the family. He returned again in September 1789 entering Corsican politics with Joseph.

In 1793, after Napoleon turned against Paoli, Letizia and her other children fled to France on 31 May, while the partisans of Paoli pillaged and burned her house. The family resettled in Toulon when the Terror was at its peak. Letizia and her daughters, to avoid being recognised as aristocrats, were described as "dressmakers" in the passports provided to them by Napoleon. After the British fleet took possession of the port of Toulon a month later the family moved to Marseilles. Penniless, Letizia had to queue for food at the soup kitchen. Her only income came from Napoleon's salary as an officer. In the Spring of 1794, after winning his first major battle as artillery commander during the siege of Toulon, Napoleon became General de Brigade. While Letizia was proud of Napoleon, she
disapproved of his marriage to the widow Joséphine de Beauharnais, on 9 March 1796, on which she was not consulted.

When Joseph became ambassador at the court of Rome on 14 May 1796, Letizia personally accompanied him to Italy. On 1 June 1797, after Napoleon's triumphant First Italian Campaign, she visited him in Milan with Caroline and Jerome, then moved back to Casa Buonaparte in Ajaccio, which had been rebuilt, renovated and redecorated for the occasion. Napoleon allowed his mother and uncle to exercise some supervision over the affairs of Corsica. As such, the prefect of the island received orders not to make an appointment without consulting Letizia or Fesch. On 28 September 1799, Napoleon, returning from his successful campaign in Egypt, stopped in Ajaccio and stayed with Letizia. 

On 7 October he left for Fréjus about to seize power in the bloodless coup d'état of 18 Brumaire, the beginning of his rise to power, and Letizia moved to Paris. Even as the mother of the First Consul, she was known to live in relative simplicity, receiving a monthly pension of 25,000 francs. On the evening of 10 November 1799, while she was with her daughters at the Theatre, the play was interrupted and it was announced that an attack against Napoleon had just been foiled, but she famously kept her composure and only left at the end of the performance. When her son Lucien clandestinely married Alexandrine de Bleschamp, known as Madame Jouberthon, against Napoleon's wishes, the brothers fell out. Letizia sided with Lucien and left Paris for Rome, where Pauline already lived as Princess Borghese, and where Letizia stayed with her half-brother, now Cardinal Fesch. Lucien and his family soon followed her.

Mother of the Emperor 
While Napoleon had made his brothers and sisters imperial highnesses, except Lucien and Jerome, Letizia did not have an official title yet. In July 1804, Cardinal Fesch wrote to Napoleon, suggesting that a title be found for her. By decree, she was given the title “Madame” but since this was also how the daughters of the King used to be called, “Mother of his Majesty the Emperor” was added to the end. She became referred to as “Madame Mère” (Madame Mother). On 2 December 1804, when Napoleon was crowned Emperor, despite being depicted in the famous painting of his coronation by David, she did not attend the coronation. When she was congratulated on her son's successes, she famously replied:  (Let's hope it lasts!).

On 19 December 1804, Letizia left Rome and took up residence at the Hotel de Brienne, 92 rue Saint Dominique in Paris, a house that she purchased from Lucien for 600,000 francs. Napoleon gave her an appanage of 500,000 a year. She did not attend the Imperial court and lived from 1805 to 1813 at the Chateau de Pont-sur-Seine, a castle that Napoleon gifted her. On the occasions when she visited Paris, she resided at her Hotel de Brienne.

Later life and death 

In 1814, Letizia shared Napoleon's exile on the island of Elba with Pauline. In February 1815, Letizia followed him to Paris during the Hundred Days. They met for the last time at the château of Malmaison on 29 June 1815. After saying goodbye to her son, she travelled from Paris to Rome to be under the protection of Pope Pius VII. She purchased the former Palazzo Rinuccini, renamed Palazzo Bonaparte (now Palazzo Misciatelli) on the corner of piazza Venezia and Via del Corso, where she lived with Joseph. During her years in Rome, she lived in seclusion with very few visitors except for her half-brother, who rarely left her. Letizia's great wealth acquired from selling her own jewellery and shrewd investments allowed her to live comfortably for the rest of her life. For a time, the painter Anna Barbara Bansi served as her companion.

Letizia died in 1836, aged 85, three weeks before the 51st anniversary of her husband's death. By then, she was nearly blind and had outlived  Napoleon by 15 years. In 1851 her body was transferred to the Imperial Chapel specially built for it in her native Ajaccio. In 1951, Carlo's body was brought in a hundred years later, to rest next to her.

Issue 
Letizia gave birth to thirteen children between 1768 and 1784; five of them died, two at birth and three in their infancy. Eight children survived.
 Napoleone Buonaparte (born and died 17 August 1765)
 Maria Anna Buonaparte (3 January 1767 – 1 January 1768)
 Joseph Bonaparte (7 January 1768 – 28 July 1844) King of Naples (1806 – 1808) and King of Spain (1808 – 1813); married Julie Clary on 1 August 1794.
 Napoleon Bonaparte (15 August 1769 – 5 May 1821), Emperor of the French (1804 – 1814; 1815); married vicomtesse Joséphine de Beauharnais in 1796 (marriage annulled 1810) and re-married to Archduchess Marie Louise of Austria on 1 April 1810.
 Maria Anna Buonaparte (14 July 1771 – 23 November 1771)
 A stillborn son or daughter (1773) 
 Lucien Bonaparte (21 March 1775 – 29 June 1840), Prince of Canino and Musignano; married Christine Boyer on 5 May 1794 and re-married to Alexandrine de Bleschamp on 26 October 1803.
 Maria Anna (Elisa) Bonaparte (3 January 1777 – 7 August 1820), Grand Duchess of Tuscany (1804 – 1809); married Felice Pasquale Baciocchi on 5 May 1797.
 Louis Bonaparte (2 September 1778 – 25 July 1846), King of Holland (1806 – 1810); married Hortense de Beauharnais on 4 January 1802.
 Pauline Bonaparte (20 October 1780 – 9 June 1825), Sovereign Princess and Duchess of Guastalla; married General Charles Leclerc on 5 May 1797 (died 1802) and re-married to Prince Camillo Borghese on 28 August 1803.
 Caroline Bonaparte (25 March 1782 – 18 May 1839), Queen consort of Naples (1800 – 1815) and Grand Duchess of Jülich-Cleves-Berg; married Joachim Murat King of Naples in 1800.
 Jérôme Bonaparte (15 November 1784 – 24 June 1860), King of Westphalia (1807 – 1813), Prince of Montfort; married Elizabeth Patterson on 24 December 1803 (marriage annulled 1806), re-married to princess Catharina of Württemberg on 22 August 1807, and married thirdly to Justine Bartolini-Baldelli in 1840 (religious) and 19 February 1853 (civil).

Arms

Notes

References

Citations

Bibliography

External links 
 

Letizia
People from Ajaccio
French people of Italian descent
1750 births
1836 deaths
People of the First French Empire
18th-century French people